Dominic "Dom" Maloney (born 12 March 1987), also known by the nickname of "Big Dom", is an English rugby league footballer who has played in the 2000s and 2010s.

Background
Dom Maloney was born in Castleford, West Yorkshire, England, and he joined the Parachute Regiment .

Playing career

Club career
Dom Maloney made his début for Featherstone Rovers on Sunday 4 March 2012.

Club career
Dom Maloney is the grandson of the rugby league  who played in the 1960s and 1970s for Hull F.C. scoring 1462-points; John Maloney.

References

External links
(archived by web.archive.org) Profile at featherstonerovers.net
(archived by web.archive.org) Halifax profile
Statistics at itsrugby.co.uk

1987 births
Living people
21st-century British Army personnel
British Parachute Regiment soldiers
Castleford Tigers players
Dewsbury Rams players
English rugby league players
Featherstone Rovers players
Halifax R.L.F.C. players
Hemel Stags players
Hull F.C. players
Rugby league props
Rugby league players from Castleford